John Low Reid  (born 1943) is a British clinical pharmacologist.

Reid graduated in medicine from the University of Oxford, then completed his training in clinical pharmacology at the Royal Postgraduate Medical School, where he was subsequently a senior lecturer and reader. He also undertook a Medical Research Council travelling fellowship to the United States' National Institutes of Health.

He became Regius professor of materia medica and therapeutics at the University of Glasgow in 1978, changing to being Regius chair of medicine and head of the department of medicine and therapeutics, in 1989.

He has served as president of the Association of Physicians of Great Britain and Ireland; of the British Society of Hypertension; and of European Society of Hypertension.

He was made an Officer of the Order of the British Empire (OBE) in the 2001 New Year Honours.

References

External links 

 

1943 births
Place of birth missing (living people)
Officers of the Order of the British Empire
Living people
Fellows of the Royal College of Physicians
Fellows of the Royal College of Physicians and Surgeons of Glasgow
Fellows of the Royal Society of Edinburgh
Fellows of the Academy of Medical Sciences (United Kingdom)
Alumni of the University of Oxford
Academics of the University of Glasgow
Regius Professors
Clinical pharmacologists